Priyudu is a 2011 Indian Telugu-language romantic drama film directed by Shravan and starring Varun Sandesh and Preetika Rao.

Cast 

Varun Sandesh as Karthika 
Preetika as Madhu Latha
Ranadhir Reddy as Vara Prasad
Kota Srinivasa Rao
Thagubothu Ramesh
Vennela Kishore 
Nassar as Karthik's father
Vijay Sai
Ali as Kuphli Baba, Hukka Baba and Pungi Baba
Pragathi
 Surekha Vani
Y. Kasi Viswanath as Madhu Latha's father
Shweta Basu Prasad (cameo appearance)

Production
Varun Sandhesh plays the role of a businessman's son. Amrita Rao's sister, Preetika, is the heroine. Danayya named the film. The film was shot in Hyderabad and a couple songs were shot in Bangkok. Preetika took lessons in Mumbai to learn Telugu.

Soundtrack
Music by Mohan Jona.

Reception
Jeevi of Idlebrain.com wrote that "Priyudu is a better film for Varun Sandesh after Kotha Bangaru Lokam. A critic from The Hindu wrote that "The story gives out an outdated approach to narration and also the characters". A critic from The Times of India wrote that "It just looks like a mish mash of many similar films of the past". 123 Telugu wrote that "Priyudu is a film that has not much going for it except for some instances of humour in the first half". A critic from Full Hyderabad opined that "The movie is a plain commonplace romance, nothing more than an over-dramatization of the kind of unremarkable situations that college youth get into".

References